Robert Adam Fleming (born 2 April 1980) is a Scottish journalist and chief political correspondent for BBC News. He was formerly its Brussels correspondent, and has previously worked for Daily Politics and Newsround. He co-presented the podcast and television programme Brexitcast, before becoming co-presenter of its successor, Newscast.

Early life
Fleming was born in 1980 in Glasgow and educated there at Hutchesons' Grammar School, an independent school, from 1989 to 1998. He went on to Hertford College at Oxford University where he studied geography, graduating in 2001 with a first class degree. Whilst at Oxford, Fleming edited The Oxford Student newspaper and worked in local radio.

Career
Fleming has worked in journalism for the Herald newspaper in Glasgow, the Daily Record and STV.

Fleming began working for the BBC, and was sponsored by them to study broadcast journalism on a postgraduate diploma course at City University, London. Fleming worked on CBBC's news programme Newsround in 2002 whilst still studying. He has been a live reporter for BBC News 24 (in 2006), a Westminster reporter (in 2008) and a BBC Three 60 Seconds presenter.

As BBC News' Brussels correspondent, Fleming acted as a regular reporter on Daily Politics and its successor Politics Live. He focused on EU politics and particularly Brexit, establishing the podcast Brexitcast with political correspondent Chris Mason, political editor Laura Kuenssberg and Europe editor Katya Adler. He began presenting Newscast after Brexitcast came to an end, and was replaced as Brussels correspondent by Nick Beake in summer 2020. In December 2020 he was appointed as the BBC News' chief political correspondent.

In June 2022, Fleming took a break from Westminster to launch Radio 4's new programme and podcast AntiSocial.

He presented an eight-part documentary series about the rise and fall of Boris Johnson for BBC Radio 4 and BBC Sounds.

Personal life
Fleming lives in London and is single.

References

External links

Contributions to The Oxford Student

 

1980 births
Living people
People educated at Hutchesons' Grammar School
Alumni of Hertford College, Oxford
British television presenters